Frank Sinatra's Greatest Hits! is Frank Sinatra's first compilation released on his own Reprise Records. It concentrates on mostly single releases from the mid to late 1960s, which fluctuates between adult contemporary pop and jazzy swing. The album opens up with Sinatra's recent number one hit "Strangers in the Night" and continues through the varied styles of music Sinatra recorded in the 60s, from easy listening ballads like "It Was a Very Good Year" and "Softly, as I Leave You" to contemporary pop like "When Somebody Loves You" and "That's Life". Greatest Hits was a modest hit, peaking at #55 on the album charts in late 1968. A second volume was issued in 1972, Frank Sinatra's Greatest Hits, Vol. 2. Both albums have since been supplanted with newer and more cohesive compilations.

Track listing
  "Strangers in the Night" (Bert Kaempfert, Charles Singleton, Eddie Snyder) - 2:25
  "Summer Wind" (Heinz Meier, Hans Bradtke, Johnny Mercer) - 2:53
  "It Was a Very Good Year" (Ervin Drake) - 4:25
  "Somewhere in Your Heart" (Russell Faith, Clarence Keltner) - 2:26
  "Forget Domani" (Norman Newell, Riz Ortolani) - 2:36
  "Somethin' Stupid" (with Nancy Sinatra) (Carson Parks) - 2:35
  "That's Life" (Kelly Gordon, Dean Kay Thompson) - 3:07
  "Tell Her (You Love Her Each Day)" (Gil Ward, Charles Watkins) - 2:40
  "The World We Knew (Over and Over)" (Kaempfert, Herbert Rehbein, Carl Sigman) - 2:47
  "When Somebody Loves You" (Sammy Cahn, Jimmy Van Heusen) - 1:54
  "This Town" (Lee Hazlewood) - 3:06
  "Softly, as I Leave You" (Hal Shaper, Antonio DeVita, Giorgio Calabrese) - 2:50

Notes 
"Strangers in the Night" recorded on April 11, 1966
The Orchestra on Tracks 1, 3 and 9 includes 16 Violins
"Summer Wind" recorded on May 16, 1966
The Orchestra on "Summer Wind" includes 9 Violins
"It Was a Very Good Year" recorded on April 22, 1965
"Somewhere in Your Heart" recorded on November 10, 1964
The Orchestra on Tracks 4, 7 and 12 includes 12 Violins
Background Vocals on Tracks 4-5 and 12 were sung by an Unidentified Vocal Group
"Forget Domani" recorded on May 6, 1965
The Orchestra on Tracks 5 and 11 includes 8 Violins
"Somethin' Stupid" recorded on February 1, 1967
The Orchestra on Tracks 6, 8 and 10 includes 10 Violins
"That's Life" recorded on October 18, 1966
Tracks 8 and 10 recorded on April 14, 1965
"The World We Knew (Over and Over)" recorded June 29-July 1, 1967
The Orchestra on "The World We Knew (Over and Over)" includes 3 French Horns and 6 Violas
"This Town" recorded on June 30, July 24 and July 27, 1967
"Softly, as I Leave You" recorded on July 17, 1964

Personnel
Information is based on Frank Sinatra's recording session information from the Jazz Discography and Sinatra Family websites

Vocalists
Frank Sinatra -  Vocals (1-3, 6, 9, 11, Lead on 4–5, 7–8, 10, 12)
Betty Allan - Background Vocals (8, 10)
Betty Jane Baker - Background Vocals (7-8, 10)
The Blossoms - Background Vocals (7)
Ella Halloran - Background Vocals (8, 10)
Jack Halloran - Background Vocals (8, 10)
Fanita James - Blossoms group member (7)
Gwen Johnson - Background Vocals (7)
Bill Kanady - Background Vocals (8, 10)
Jean King - Blossoms group member (7)
Darlene Love - Blossoms group member (7)
Loulie Jean Norman - Background Vocals (8, 10)
Thurl Ravenscroft - Background Vocals (8, 10)
Paul Sandberg - Background Vocals (8, 10)
Nancy Sinatra - Vocals (6)
Jackie Ward - Background Vocals (7)

Leaders
Ernie Freeman - Musical arrangement (1, 4–5, 7–10, 12), Conductor (1, 4–5, 7, 12), Piano (5, 8, 10)
Gordon Jenkins - Music arrangement (3), Conductor (3, 8, 10)
Donnie Lanier - Conductor (1, 5, 8, 10), Guitar (4, 11, additional on 9)
Claus Ogerman - Conductor (6)
Nelson Riddle - Musical arrangement, Conductor (2)
Billy Strange - Musical arrangement (6), Conductor (6, 9, 11)

Strings
Chuck Berghofer - String Bass (1, 4–5, 8, 10–11, additional on 9)
Maurice Bialkin - Cello (9)
Norman Botnick - Viola (7)
Maurice Brown - Cello (9)
Ray Brown - String Bass (7)
Joseph DiFiore - Viola (1, 5, 7, 12)
Alvin Dinkin - Viola (3-4, 12)
Joseph DiTullio - Cello (7)
Justin DiTullio - Cello (2, 12)
Jesse Ehrlich - Cello (1, 4, 8, 10–12)
Anne Goodman - Cello (4, 8, 10, 12)
Elizabeth Greenschpoon - Cello (2)
Allan Harshman - Viola (4)
Milt Hinton - String Bass (9, 11)
Milt Holland - String Bass (11), Additional Percussion (9)
Harry Hyams - Viola (1, 5, 8, 10–11)
Armand Kaproff - Cello (1-3, 7)
Carol Kaye - Electric Bass (6), Fender Bass (11, additional on 9)
Louis Kievman - Viola (3)
Lawrence Knechtel - Fender Bass (7, additional on 9), Additional String Bass (9, 11)
Peter Makas Jr. - Cello (9)
Charles McCracken - Cello (9)
Joe Mondragon - String Bass (12)
Alex Neiman - Viola (1, 4–5, 7–8, 10–12)
Gareth Nuttycombe - Viola (12)
Ralph Peña - String Bass (2, 6)
Kurt Reher - Cello (4, 7, 12)
Paul Robyn - Viola (2-4)
Mike Rubin - String Bass (3)
Myron Sandler - Viola (5)
Emmet Sargeant - Cello (1, 8, 10, 12)
Joseph Saxon - Viola (5), Cello (1, 4, 8, 10–12)
Frederick Seykora - Cello (7)
Alan Shulman - Cello (9)
Barbara Simons - Viola (2)
Joseph Tekula - Cello (9)
Darrel Terwilliger - Viola (1)
Abraham Weiss - Viola (7)

Horns and Woodwinds
Vincent Abato - Saxophone, Woodwinds (9)
Bob Alexander - Trombone (9)
Wayne Andre - Trombone (9)
Ray Beckenstein - Saxophone, Woodwinds (9)
George Berg - Saxophone, Woodwinds (9)
Louis Blackburn - Trombone (7-8, 10)
Phil Bodner - Saxophone, Woodwinds (9)
Robert Bryant - Trumpet (8, 10, 12)
Pete Candoli - Trumpet (2)
Pete Carpenter - Trombone (8, 10)
Roy Caton - Trumpet (6, 8, 10–11)
Buddy Collette - Saxophone (7), Woodwinds (7, 12)
Marshall Cram - Trombone (4)
Mel Davis - Trumpet (9)
Vincent DeRosa - French Horn (1)
Melinda Eckels - Oboe (3)
Harry Estrin - Saxophone, Woodwinds (9)
Virgil Evans - Trumpet (11)
Don Fagerquist - Trumpet (2)
Paul Faulise - Bass Trombone (9)
Dick Forrest - Trumpet (11)
Chuck Gentry - Saxophone, Woodwinds (2, 5)
Bernie Glow - Trumpet (9)
Ted Gompers - Saxophone, Woodwinds (9)
Justin Gordon - Saxophone, Woodwinds (2)
Bill Green - Flute (1), Saxophone, Woodwinds (2, 5, 7, 11)
Lloyd Hildebrand - Bassoon (3)
James Horn - Saxophone, Woodwinds (11)
Dick Hyde - Trombone (7, 11, additional on 9)
Clyde Hylton - Clarinet (3)
Plas Johnson - Saxophone, Woodwinds (5, 7)
Harry Klee - Clarinet (3), Saxophone, Woodwinds (2)
Robert Knight - Bass Trombone (11)
Arnold Koblentz - Oboe (3)
Andreas Kostelas - Flute (1)
Cappy Lewis - Trumpet (2, 7)
Markie Markowitz - Trumpet (9)
Lew McCreary - Trombone (7, 11, additional on 9)
Oliver Mitchell - Trumpet (6-7, 11)
Buddy Morrow - Trombone (9)
Abe Most - Saxophones, Woodwinds (2)
Dick Noel - Trombone (2)
Tommy Pederson - Trombone (2)
Romeo Penque - Saxophone, Woodwinds (9)
Richard Perissi - French Horn (1)
Morris Repass - Trombone (11)
George Roberts - Bass Trombone (2)
Gale Robinson - French Horn (1)
Ernie Royal - Trumpet (9)
Willie Schwartz - Flute, Saxophone (5, 7, Alto on 4), Woodwinds (5, 7)
Tom Shepard - Trombone (2)
Henry Sigismonti - French Horn (1)
Wayne Songer - Clarinet (3)
Anthony Terran - Trumpet (7-8, 10–11)
Clark Terry - Trumpet (9)
Ray Triscari - Trumpet (2)

Other Instruments
Hal Blaine - Drums (1, 4–8, 10–12, additional on 9)
Eddie Brackett Jr. - Percussion (1, 5, 7–8, 10), Additional Drums (11)
Russell Bridges - Piano (5, 8, 10)
Dennis Budimir - Guitar (8, 10, additional on 9)
Al Caiola - Guitar (9, 11)
Glen Campbell - Guitar (1, 6, 11)
Frank Capp - Percussion (5, 8, 10–11)
Alvin Casey - Guitar (1, 6, 11, acoustic on 7)
Gary Chester - Drums (9, 11)
Gary Coleman - Vibes (7), Additional Percussion (9)
Buddy Collette - Woodwinds (12)
Irv Cottler - Drums (2)
George Devens - Percussion (9, 11)
Eugene DiNovi - Piano (4)
Nick Fatool - Drums (3)
Victor Feldman - Percussion (2, 6, 11)
Stan Freeman - Piano (9, 11)
Eric Gale - Guitar (9, 11)
Gene Garf - Piano (12)
Bobby Gibbons - Guitar (12, additional on 9)
John Gray - Guitar (5, 8, 10)
Al Hendrickson - Guitar (12)
Artie Kane - Organ played by (2)
Carol Kaye - Electric Bass (6), Fender Bass (11)
Phil Kraus - Percussion (9, 11)
Carl Lynch - Guitar (9, 11)
Lincoln Mayorga - Piano (4)
Michael Melvoin - Piano, Piano Overdubs (11), Organ played by (7)
Bill Miller - Piano (1-4, 6–8, 10–12)
Louis Morell - Guitar (11, additional on 9), Acoustic Guitar (7)
Donald Owens - Piano (6)
Bill Pitman - Guitar (1, 4–5, 8, 10)
Bucky Pizzarelli - Guitar (9, 11)
Ray Pohlman - Electric Guitar (7)
Don Randi - Additional Piano (9)
Emil Richards - Percussion (1, 5, 8, 10, 12), Mallets (4)
Bobby Rosengarden - Drums (9, 11), Percussion (9)
Margaret Ross - Harp (9)
Michel Rubini - Piano (1)
Ray Sherman - Piano (12)
Tommy Tedesco - Guitar (1, 4–5, 12)
Vincent Terri - Guitar (3)
Toots Thielemans - Guitar, Harmonica (9, 11)
Kathryn Thompson Vail - Harp (3)
Al Viola - Guitar (2, 5)
Moe Wechsler - Piano (9, 11)

References

1968 greatest hits albums
Frank Sinatra compilation albums
Reprise Records compilation albums
Albums produced by Jimmy Bowen
Albums produced by Sonny Burke